Arthur Hughes (27 January 1832 – 22 December 1915) was an English painter and illustrator associated with the Pre-Raphaelite Brotherhood.

Biography
Hughes was born in London. In 1846 he entered the art school at Somerset House, his first master being Alfred Stevens, and later entered the Royal Academy schools. It was here, after reading a copy of The Germ, that he met John Everett Millais, Holman Hunt, and Dante Gabriel Rossetti, although he never became an official member of the Pre-Raphaelite group of painters. His first picture, Musidora, was hung at the Royal Academy when he was only 17, and thenceforth he contributed almost annually not only to the Royal Academy but later also to the Grosvenor and New Gallery exhibitions. After having his painting Ophelia hung near Millais' version of the same name, they became friends and Hughes served as the model for the male figure in The Proscribed Royalist.

In 1855 Hughes married Tryphena Foord, his model for April Love. They had five children of whom one, Arthur Foord Hughes, also became a painter.  Hughes died in Kew Green, London in 1915, leaving about 700 known paintings and drawings, along with over 750 book illustrations. Following the death of Tryphena Hughes in 1921, their daughter Emily had to move to a smaller house. There was, therefore, a shortage of space. As a result, she had her father's remaining preparatory sketches, and all his private papers and correspondence, destroyed. He was the uncle of Edward Robert Hughes.

Hughes is buried in Richmond Cemetery.

Works
His best-known paintings are April Love and The Long Engagement, both of which depict troubled couples contemplating the transience of love and beauty. They were inspired by John Everett Millais's earlier "couple" paintings but place far greater emphasis on the pathos of human inability to maintain the freshness of youthful feeling in comparison to the regenerative power of nature.

Like Millais, Hughes also painted Ophelia (which is housed at Toledo Museum of Art) and illustrated Keats's poem The Eve of St. Agnes. Hughes's version of the latter is in the form of a secular triptych, a technique he repeated for scenes from Shakespeare's As You Like It. His works are noted for their magical, glowing colouring and delicate draughtsmanship.

The oil portrait Springtide, first exhibited in Dublin in 1855, features his wife Tryphena.

Illustrations 
Although most of Hughes' later paintings are not well regarded, it is considered that the black and white drawings of his later career were some of his best. He illustrated several books, including Tom Brown’s Schooldays (1869), George Macdonald's At the Back of the North Wind (1871) and The Princess and the Goblin (1872) and Christina Rossetti’s Sing Song (1872) and Speaking Likenesses (1874).

He also produced numerous illustrations for Norman MacLeod's monthly magazine, Good Words.

See also
List of Pre-Raphaelite paintings - includes catalogue of Arthur Hughes' work with links to individual paintings' articles.
List of British painters

Notes

External links

Hughes: Pre-Raphaelite Painter & Book Illustrator (archive copy at archive.org)
Arthur Hughes at PreRaphaelites.org, Birmingham Museums & Art Gallery
 
 
 Hughes at ArtMagick.com (archived 2006-10-23)
 Arthur Hughes at Invaluable.com
 
 

 
19th-century English painters
English male painters
20th-century English painters
English illustrators
Pre-Raphaelite painters
1832 births
1915 deaths
Artists' Rifles soldiers
Burials at Richmond Cemetery
19th-century English male artists
Pre-Raphaelite illustrators
20th-century English male artists